Myene may refer to:

 Myene language, spoken in Gabon
Myene, Burma